Ricardo Bermudez Garcia (born November 19, 1975), known as Ricardinho, is a Brazilian volleyball player. He competed in the 2004 Summer Olympics.

Garcia was born in São Paulo. In 2004, he was part of the Brazilian team which won the gold medal in the Olympic tournament. He played all eight matches.

In 2007 he was dismissed from the team, reportedly because of contention with other team members. He rejoined the team for the 2012 Olympics in London where they won the silver medal.

Sporting achievements

Individuals
 2004 FIVB World League – Best Setter 
 2004 Summer Olympics – Best Setter
 2005 America's Cup – Best Setter
 2005 FIVB World Grand Champions Cup – Best Setter
 2007 FIVB World League – Most Valuable Player

References

External links
 

1975 births
Living people
Brazilian men's volleyball players
Olympic volleyball players of Brazil
Volleyball players at the 2004 Summer Olympics
Volleyball players at the 2012 Summer Olympics
Olympic gold medalists for Brazil
Olympic silver medalists for Brazil
Olympic medalists in volleyball
Medalists at the 2012 Summer Olympics
Medalists at the 2004 Summer Olympics
Volleyball players at the 2003 Pan American Games
Pan American Games bronze medalists for Brazil
Pan American Games medalists in volleyball
Medalists at the 2003 Pan American Games
Setters (volleyball)
Sportspeople from São Paulo